Gerald J. Mullery is an American lawyer and politician from the U.S. commonwealth of Pennsylvania. A member of the Democratic Party, he was a member of the Pennsylvania House of Representatives for the 119th district from 2011 to 2022.

Gerald Mullery defeated Bob Morgan and Gary Zingaretti in the primary of 2010. He then went on to defeat Republican Rick Arnold in November 2010. Mullery assumed office in January 2011.

In 2012 he ran against Republican Rick Arnold again and successfully defended his seat.

In 2014 Mullery defeated fellow Democrat Tony Bonomo in the 2014 primary. Bonomo, a  Hazleton Area School Board Member lost by a 3 to 1 vote margin. Mullery was unopposed in the November general of 2014.

In 2016 Mullery defeated Justin Behrens from Mountaintop in the November 2016 Presidential Election.

In 2018 Mullery defeated Justin Behrens again in the November General Election.

In 2020, Mullery defeated businessman John Chura from West Hazleton in the November General Election.

Mullery currently sits on the Ethics and Labor & Industry committees.

On January 13, 2022, Mullery announced he would not seek re-election and retire at the end of the year.

References

External links

State Representative Gerald Mullery official caucus site
Gerald Mullery (D) official PA House site
Gerald Mullery for State Representative official campaign site

Living people
Democratic Party members of the Pennsylvania House of Representatives
Duquesne University School of Law alumni
21st-century American politicians
Year of birth missing (living people)